George Woodward Greene (July 4, 1831 – July 21, 1895) was an American lawyer, jurist, and politician who served part of one term as a U.S. Representative from New York from 1869 to 1870.

Biography 
Born in Mount Hope, New York, Greene pursued classical studies and graduated from the University of Pennsylvania. He taught at a school and studied law; in 1860, he was admitted to the bar and commenced practice in Goshen, New York.

He became a school commissioner for Orange County, and he served as judge of the Orange County Courts from 1861 to 1864.

Congress and contested election 
Greene presented credentials as a Democratic Member-elect to the Forty-first Congress and served from March 4, 1869, to February 17, 1870, when he was succeeded by Charles H. Van Wyck, who contested his election.

State legislature 
He was a member of the New York State Assembly (Orange Co., 2nd D.) from 1885 to 1890.

Death 
Greene died in New York City on July 21, 1895. He was interred in "The Plains" Cemetery, Otisville, New York.

References

1831 births
1895 deaths
University of Pennsylvania alumni
New York (state) state court judges
Democratic Party members of the United States House of Representatives from New York (state)
Democratic Party members of the New York State Assembly
People from Mount Hope, New York
People from Goshen, New York
19th-century American politicians
19th-century American judges